The 2017–18 film awards season began in November 2017 with the Gotham Independent Film Awards 2017 and ended in March 2018 with the 90th Academy Awards.

Award ceremonies

November

December

January

February

March

References

2017 film awards
2018 film awards
American film awards